Valentina Aleksandrovna Prudskova (27 December 1938 – 23 August 2020) was a Soviet fencer. She won gold in the women's team foil event at the 1960 Summer Olympics and a silver in the same event at the 1964 Summer Olympics.

Prudskova's mother, Zinaida Nikolaevna Prudskova, was a farmer and housewife. Her father, Aleksandr Petrovich Prudskov, worked at railways and fought in the Winter War and World War II; he died of pneumonia in 1950, aged 40. Shortly after that, his family moved from Yershov to Saratov, where Prudskova started training in fencing, together with her cousin. Her career advanced in 1954 when she won her first national title.

Prudskova was a member of the Soviet foil team from 1957 to 1966. During those years she won four gold and two silver team medals at the world championships, as well as one individual bronze. In 1962 she graduated from Saratov State Technical University with a degree in metal processing and then until 1969 worked at a metalworking plant in Saratov. After that she coached fencing at a sport school. She was awarded the Order of the Badge of Honour and Medal "For Labour Valour".

Prudskova had a daughter, Marina, who worked as an arts teacher.

References

1938 births
2020 deaths
Russian female foil fencers
Soviet female foil fencers
Olympic fencers of the Soviet Union
Fencers at the 1960 Summer Olympics
Fencers at the 1964 Summer Olympics
Olympic gold medalists for the Soviet Union
Olympic silver medalists for the Soviet Union
Olympic medalists in fencing
Medalists at the 1960 Summer Olympics
Medalists at the 1964 Summer Olympics
Universiade medalists in fencing
Universiade bronze medalists for the Soviet Union
Medalists at the 1961 Summer Universiade